Witold Henryk Szyguła (22 November 1940 – 4 September 2003) was a Polish international footballer and manager who played as a goalkeeper. He signed for Scottish club Hamilton Academical in June 1971, alongside fellow Polish internationals Alfred Olek and Roman Strazalkowski. They were "the first players from behind the Iron Curtain […] to play in Britain." The deal was orchestrated by Hamilton's chairman Jan Stepek, who was himself Polish, in return for electronic goods being sent to Poland. Szyguła also played in Poland for Zagłębie.

References

External links

1940 births
2003 deaths
Sportspeople from Chorzów
Polish footballers
Poland international footballers
Hamilton Academical F.C. players
Scottish Football League players
Association football goalkeepers
Polish expatriate footballers
Polish expatriate sportspeople in Scotland
Expatriate footballers in Scotland
Ekstraklasa players
Zagłębie Sosnowiec players
Polish football managers
Zagłębie Sosnowiec managers